Matias Lassen (born 15 March 1996) is a Danish professional ice hockey defenseman. He is currently playing with the Malmö Redhawks of the Swedish Hockey League (SHL).

Lassen made his Swedish Hockey League debut playing with Leksands IF during the 2016–17 SHL season.

Career statistics

Regular season and playoffs

International

References

External links
 

1996 births
Living people
Leksands IF players
Danish ice hockey defencemen
Malmö Redhawks players
Mora IK players
IK Pantern players
People from Rødovre
Rødovre Mighty Bulls players
Ice hockey players at the 2022 Winter Olympics
Olympic ice hockey players of Denmark
Sportspeople from the Capital Region of Denmark